Café Oriental is a 1962 German musical comedy film directed by Rudolf Schündler and starring Elke Sommer, Jerome Courtland, Trude Herr, and Bill Ramsey.

The film's sets were designed by the art directors Paul Markwitz and Wilhelm Vorwerg. It was shot at the Spandau Studios in Berlin.

Plot 
Several students at a music college, as well as a waiter and a housekeeper have enjoyed an unusual inheritance, the Café Allotria. The inheritance has only one catch: the café is hopelessly over-indebted. The bailiff is the only permanent guest in the somewhat run-down and boring place.

The community of heirs has an idea: why not spice up and refurbish the café by offering a music combo that really stirs up the dancing audience? The café will be thoroughly renovated and changed, will be given a Middle Eastern touch and will be called "Café Oriental" from now on. The bailiff, an enthusiastic jazz trumpeter, is also involved. The store soon became a hot spot for music lovers and dance fans.

Finally, the love that develops between the protagonists Sylvia, a student of classical music, and Michael, a hit star, as well as Sylvia's housekeeper Valentine and the manager Bill, is not neglected.

Cast

References

Bibliography

External links
 

1962 films
West German films
1960s German-language films
German musical comedy films
1962 musical comedy films
Films directed by Rudolf Schündler
Films shot at Spandau Studios
1960s German films